Enoc Perez born 1967) is a contemporary Puerto Rican artist best known for his paintings and oil stick drawings of Modernist architecture.

Background
Perez was born in 1967 in San Juan, Puerto Rico. He obtained a BFA from the Pratt Institute and an MFA from Hunter College, both in New York. He began painting depictions of landmark buildings in the city, notably of the Headquarters of the United Nations, Lever House, and the Seagram Building.

Career
Perez's works are held in the collections of the Corcoran Art Gallery in Washington, D.C., the Whitney Museum of American Art in New York, and the Pennsylvania Academy of Fine Arts in Philadelphia, among others.

Personal life
Perez lives and works in New York, NY.

Solo exhibitions

2018
Dallas Contemporary, Dallas, TX

2017
UTA Artist Space, Los Angeles, CA. "Embassies"
Brand New Gallery, Milan, Italy. "Casitas"
Leila Heller Gallery, Dubai, United Arab Emirates. "Desert Bloom"
Harper Books, East Hampton, NY. "Nudes"

2015
Koenig & Clinton, New York. "Digs"
Peter Blum Gallery, New York. "One World Trade Center"
The Philip Johnson Glass House. New Canaan, Connecticut, "Lipstick"
Galerie Nathalie Obadia, Paris. "Recent Paintings"
Danziger Gallery, New York. "Cut-Outs"

2014
Harper's Books, East Hampton, NY. "Summer Jobs"
Thomas Ammann Fine Arts AG, Zurich. "New Work"
Le Royal Monceau, Paris. "Paintings"

2013
Galerie Nathalie Obadia, Paris. "Paris Mon Amour"
Acquavella Galleries, New York. "The Good Days"

2012
Corcoran Art Gallery, Washington D.C.. "Utopia"

2011
Galerie Nathalie Obadia, Bruxelles. "Works on paper"
Faggionato Fine Arts, London. "Nudes"

2010
Acquavella Galleries, New York.
Galerie Michael Janssen, Berlin. "Monochromes"

2009
Mitchell-Innes & Nash, New York

2008
Galerie Michael Janssen, Berlin. "Tender"
Collezione Maramotti, Reggio Emilia, Italy.
Faggionato Fine Arts, London. "Suite 720"

2007
Museum of Contemporary Art North Miami
Lever House Lobby Gallery, NY
Galerie Nathalie Obadia, Paris "Faraway"

2006
Mitchell-Innes & Nash, New York, NY, "New York"
Faggionato, New York, "Works on Paper"
Mario Diacono at ARS LIBRI, Boston, MA, "The United Nations, New York"

2005
Faggionato, London, "Deluxe"

2004
The Happy Lion, Los Angeles, CA, "Caribe Club"
Sammlung Sander, Berlin, Germany "The Party"
Elizabeth Dee, New York, NY "Works on Paper"

2003
Elizabeth Dee, New York, NY "Monuments"

2002
Kunstverein Heilbronn, Germany, "Holiday"
Elisabeth Dee Gallery, New York, NY, "New Work"
Dee / Glasoe, New York, NY "Enoc Perez"

2001
Galerie Michael Janssen, Cologne, "The Secret"

1999
Bronwyn Keenan Gallery, New York, NY, "Winter"
Turner & Runyon, Dallas, Texas, "Daydreaming"

1993
White Columns, New York, NY
Galeria Uno, Caracas, Venezuela

References

Living people
1967 births
Pratt Institute alumni
Hunter College alumni
Artists from New York (state)